Michael Seth Marler (born March 27, 1981), is a former Arena football Placekicker. He played college football at Tulane. He was originally signed by the Jacksonville Jaguars of the National Football League.

Marler also played for the Atlanta Falcons and Tampa Bay Storm.

High school career
Marler attended Parkview High School in Lilburn, Georgia and was a good student and a standout in football and soccer. In football, he was a three-year letterman. In soccer, he played Defender and Midfielder. It was here that he gained the nickname, Lilburn leg.

College career
Marler attended Tulane University and was a double major in Marketing and Management and was a letterman in football. In football, as a freshman, he was named to the All-Conference USA Freshman Team, was a Second-team All-Conference USA selection, and was a semi-finalist for the Lou Groza Award. As a sophomore, he was a Second-team All-Louisiana selection and was a semi-finalist for the Lou Groza Award. He led his team in points and ranked second in Conference USA for points with 85. As a junior, He was named to the Conference USA Commissioner's Honor Roll, was selected as an All-American. Playing against East Carolina, he kicked a 53-yard field goal which was the longest field goal he kicked in his college football career. As a senior, he also decided to accept punting duties and was named Second-team All-Louisiana as a Kicker and as a Punter, and was named as a Second-team All-Conference USA selection as a punter. During his senior year, he was also twice named the Conference USA Player of the Week and won the 2001 Lou Groza Award. He also scored a school record of 333 points for his career.

Professional career

National Football League
Marler went unselected in the 2003 NFL Draft, however he signed as an undrafted free agent with the Jacksonville Jaguars. As a rookie he made 60.6% of his field goal attempts. He was cut during the 2004 Jaguars training camp after losing his starting position to Josh Scobee. He was again re-signed in 2005, but was later released during the preseason.

Marler was signed by the Atlanta Falcons in 2006, however he was released before the start of the season.

After his stint with the Falcons, he once again re-signed with the Jaguars, but again was later released.

Arena Football League
On March 16, 2007, Marler signed with the Tampa Bay Storm of the Arena Football League. As a rookie in the AFL, he made 16-of-20 field goal attempts and 92-of-99 PAT attempts, as well as recording two tackles. In 2008, he made 11-of-18 field goal attempts and 112-of-125 PAT attempts, as well as recording eight tackles.

See also
 List of Arena Football League and National Football League players

External links
 Seth Marler's Tulane Greenwave bio

1981 births
Living people
Players of American football from Atlanta
American football placekickers
Tulane Green Wave football players
Jacksonville Jaguars players
Atlanta Falcons players
Tampa Bay Storm players